Piconzé is a 1973 Brazilian animated film written and directed by Ype Nakashima. It's the first color animated Brazilian feature film.

Plot
The story is set in a village called Green Valley, where Piconzé lives with his friends: Papo Louro the parrot and Chico Leitão the pig. When Gustavo Bigodão kidnaps Maria Esmeralda, Piconzé's girlfriend, the three set off to the rescue. Along the way, they encounter a dragon and a witch, crossing the kingdom of Saci.

References

Brazilian animated films
1973 animated films
1970s Portuguese-language films
Brazilian mythology in popular culture